Triosteum angustifolium, commonly known as yellowfruit horse-gentian, is a species of flowering plant belonging to the family Caprifoliaceae. It is found Eastern North America, primarily in Limestone regions.

References

Caprifoliaceae
Plants described in 1753
Taxa named by Carl Linnaeus
Flora of Eastern Canada
Flora of the Northeastern United States
Flora of the Southeastern United States
Flora of the North-Central United States
Flora of the South-Central United States
Flora without expected TNC conservation status